Łukasz Kubot and Marcelo Melo were the defending champions, but they decided to participate in Dubai instead.

Ken and Neal Skupski won the title, defeating Marcel Granollers and Horacio Zeballos in the final, 7–6(7–3), 6–4.

Seeds

Draw

Draw

Qualifying

Seeds

Qualifiers
  Luke Saville /  John-Patrick Smith

Lucky losers
  Dominik Koepfer /  Artem Sitak

Qualifying draw

References

External links
 Main draw
 Qualifying draw

2021 ATP Tour
Men's 2